Finsch's imperial pigeon (Ducula finschii) is a bird species in the family Columbidae. It is endemic to Papua New Guinea. Its natural habitats are subtropical or tropical moist lowland forests and subtropical or tropical moist montane forests.

Formerly classified as a Species of least concern by the IUCN, it was suspected to be rarer than generally assumed. Following the evaluation of its population size, this was found to be correct, and it is consequently uplisted to near threatened status in 2008.

Footnotes

References
 BirdLife International (BLI) (2008): [2008 IUCN Redlist status changes]. Retrieved 2008-MAY-23.

Ducula
Birds of Papua New Guinea
Birds described in 1882
Taxonomy articles created by Polbot